HMS Maenad was a reciprocating engine-powered  built for the Royal Navy during the Second World War. She survived the war and was scrapped in 1957.

Name
In Greek mythology, the Maenad's were the frenzied women followers of Dionysus (also known as Bacchus), the god of wine.

Design and description
The ships' complement consisted of 85 officers and ratings.

The reciprocating ships had two vertical triple-expansion steam engines, each driving one shaft, using steam provided by two Admiralty three-drum boilers.

The Algerine class was armed with a QF  Mk V anti-aircraft gun and four twin-gun mounts for Oerlikon 20 mm cannon. The latter guns were in short supply when the first ships were being completed and they often got a proportion of single mounts. By 1944, single-barrel Bofors 40 mm mounts began replacing the twin 20 mm mounts on a one for one basis. All of the ships were fitted for four throwers and two rails for depth charges.

Construction and career
Maenad was laid down by Redfern Construction Ltd., Toronto, Ontario, Canada on 1 March 1944. She was launched on 8 June 1944 and completed on 11 November of that year. She was initially assigned to the 11th Flotilla of the East Indies Fleet with her last sweep being the Addu Atoll in the Maldives.

Maenad was then put into reserve in March 1947 and became part of the 6th Flotilla based at Singapore. The ship arrived for scrapping at Grays on 18 December 1957.

References

Bibliography

External links
HMS Maenad at uboat.net
HMS Maenad at battleships-cruisers.co.uk

 

Algerine-class minesweepers of the Royal Navy
Ships built in Ontario
1944 ships
World War II minesweepers of the United Kingdom